Shayron Curiel (born April 17, 1991 in Willemstad, Curacao) is a Dutch footballer who played professionally for Eerste Divisie clubs Sparta Rotterdam and FC Dordrecht during the 2010-2012 football seasons. He currently plays for amateur club VV Nieuwerkerk.

Club career
Curiel played in the Sparta Rotterdam academy and made his professional debut against FC Den Bosch in October 2010. Next season he moved to FC Dordrecht before a jail sentence cut his career short. He was given a second chance at Dordrecht in summer 2015 after joining them from amateur side Alexandria '66, but was released in January 2016 due to ill discipline.

He then moved into amateur football, where he played again for Alexandria '66 before joining Nieuwerkerk for the 2017/18 season.

Jail sentence
In 2012 Curiel took part in a robbery in Rotterdam. He spent two years in jail after being recognized on CCTV.

References

1991 births
Living people
People from Willemstad
Dutch people of Curaçao descent
Association football forwards
Dutch footballers
Sparta Rotterdam players
FC Dordrecht players
Eerste Divisie players
Dutch people convicted of robbery